Dexter Marquise McCluster (born August 25, 1988) is a former American football running back. He played college football for the University of Mississippi. He was drafted by the Kansas City Chiefs in the second round of the 2010 NFL Draft and also spent time with the Tennessee Titans and San Diego Chargers.

High school career
McCluster attended Largo High School in Largo, Florida where he was an honor roll student and where he lettered in football, basketball and track. He was a state qualifier in the long jump and in the high jump. In football, his junior season, he rushed for 1,424 yards and 14 touchdowns. As a senior in leading the Largo Packers to the 2005 District Championship, he rushed for 2,490 yards and 39 touchdowns. Also as a senior, he was named to the First-team All-State 5A by the Florida Sports Writers Association and named All-Suncoast Player of the Year by the St. Petersburg Times Mr.2000. McCluster was selected Most Valuable Player in the Florida Athletic Coaches Association North-South Football All- Star Classic game.

In track & field, McCluster was a state qualifier in the jumping events. He got personal-best leaps of 6.94 meters in the long jump and 1.99 meters in the high jump. In the sprinting events, he recorded times of 11.53 seconds in the 100 meters and 22.67 seconds in the 200 meters.

College career
As a true freshman at the University of Mississippi in 2006, McCluster started five of the first six games before suffering an injury. He finished the season with 15 receptions for 232 receiving yards, 68 rushing yards on eight attempts and two touchdowns. As a sophomore in 2007 he played in the final eight games of the year after missing the first four due to the injury. He finished with 326 yards on 27 receptions and 63 yards on 6 rushing attempts with two touchdowns. As a junior in 2008 he earned second-team All-SEC honors from the Associated Press after rushing for 655 yards on 109 attempts and 44 receptions for 625 yards with seven touchdowns.

McCluster's senior season was full of highlights as he set two school records against Tennessee for rushing yards in a game with 282 and all-purpose yards in a game with 324. In his final game in Vaught-Hemingway Stadium, he ran for 148 yards and threw the only collegiate touchdown pass of his career in the 25-23 win over then 9th-ranked LSU. He rushed for 1,169 yards on 181 attempts (a 6.4 yards per carry average), and made 44 receptions for 520 yards with 12 total touchdowns that made him the only player in SEC history to rush for over 1,000 yards and receive for 500 yards in a single season.  He finished his college career at Ole Miss with 3,685 yards from scrimmage and 23 TD's.

College statistics

Professional career
According to CBSSports.com, McCluster was projected to be drafted in the second round of the 2010 NFL Draft. On April 23, McCluster was drafted 36th overall by the Kansas City Chiefs in the second round of the 2010 NFL Draft.

Kansas City Chiefs
McCluster signed a $5.15 million, 4-year contract with the Chiefs on July 28, 2010. McCluster scored his first NFL touchdown in his professional debut on a 94-yard punt return on September 13, 2010 against the San Diego Chargers. The 94-yard return was the longest punt return in Chiefs history. McCluster scored his first rushing NFL touchdown on a run in the season finale of the Chiefs 2011 season.

Tennessee Titans
On March 11, 2014, McCluster signed a three-year, $12 million contract to join the Tennessee Titans. The Titans waived McCluster on September 2, 2016.

San Diego Chargers
McCluster was signed to the San Diego Chargers on September 20, 2016. He was placed on the Reserve/Non Football Injury list with a fractured forearm.

Toronto Argonauts
On July 16, 2018, McCluster signed with the Toronto Argonauts of the Canadian Football League. He made his debut on September 28, 2018 and recorded 4 rushes for 27 yards, 6 catches for 46 yards, and handled return duties on special teams. McCluster played in four games for the Argos during the 2018 season, and produced 117 yards on 22 carries, 111 yards on 12 catches, he also returned one punt return for six yards, and two kickoffs for 40 yards. He was released by the Argos on May 6, 2019.

Massachusetts Pirates
On May 15, 2019, McCluster signed with the Massachusetts Pirates of the National Arena League. McCluster appeared in 6 games while recording 19 receptions for 159 yards and 2 receiving touchdowns.

References

External links

Official Website
Tennessee Titans bio

1988 births
Living people
African-American players of American football
American football return specialists
American football running backs
American football wide receivers
Kansas City Chiefs players
Los Angeles Chargers players
Ole Miss Rebels football players
People from Largo, Florida
Players of American football from Florida
San Diego Chargers players
Sportspeople from Pinellas County, Florida
Tennessee Titans players
Unconferenced Pro Bowl players
21st-century African-American sportspeople
20th-century African-American people